The Grêmio Recreativo Escola de Samba União da Ilha do Governador (Recreation Guild Samba School Union of Governor's Island) was founded on March 7, 1953 by the friends Maurício Gazelle, and Quincas Orphylo, who were in Cacuia, the main site of the carnival parade of the Ilha do Governador, watching the presentation of small schools of samba and blocks of various districts of the island. It was then decided that the neighborhood of Cacuia should be represented by a samba school. Currently, the school is based in Estrada do Galeão in the neighborhood of Cacuia.

History

The União da Ilha do Governador remained some time between the second and third groups, and in 1974, were crowned champions when the second group received access to the main group from the years following.

From 1977, with the theme "Sunday", till 1980, when they took second place with the theme "Good, Nice and Cheap", the Island has made a fashionable impression, with no definitive one of the samba schools more sympathetic to the judges. The school took to the parade Sapucaí light, cheap and cheerful. This would be the hallmark of the Island, held today. Their costumes are usually mild, without great splendor, making the parade for the performance. The school also can establish a good communication with the public and is considered one of the nicest of the carnival. The Today was the samba of the Island in 1978 and that same year was recorded by Elizeth Cardoso, but it was the first recording of Simone in 1983 (CD Delights and Delusions and re-recorded the live CD Simone), when she became popular.

In recent years, the best remembered parade of the island was in 1989. The theme song "Party profane" had the refrain "I'll get drunk with happiness" that, to date, is sung all over the country. That year, the school was in third place.

The last good result was obtained in 1994, with "Abrakadabra," which came in fourth, their last appearance in the Parade of Champions. Since then, they have achieved good placements.

In 2000, with "Not to say I did not speak of flowers", the Island came in eighth place, addressing some of the darkest of the 500 years of Brazil: a military dictatorship from 1964 to 1985.

In 2001, the school won 13th place in the Special Group, and were thus lowered to Access Group A in 2002, where they had ups and downs.
 
In 2008, even without many resources, the school had a parade of claw, and revived "É hoje o dia" ("Today is the Day"), which earned them fifth place.

From 2008, the samba-school based at the Ilha do Governador neighborhood in Rio de Janeiro city, literally 2 or 3 miles from the Rio de Janeiro-Galeão International Airport, started a professionalization process, with the introduction of a series of management techniques. A marketing department was established, the renovation of its headquarters started to gain interest (it was finalized May 2012), the financial department re-structured and a series of partnerships started to sprout. Today, União da Ilha do Governador Samba School has as one of its main partners Grupo Petrópolis, with Itaipava beer.

In 2009, the "insulana" (islander) samba-school, as it is sometimes called by its revelers, chose the parade theme "Travel is necessary – extraordinary journeys through worlds familiar and unknown". The carnival parade organizer Jack Vasconcelos became Carnival Champion of Group A with 239.9 points, returning after his demotion in 2001 to the so sought after Rio Carnival Special Group in 2010.

In 2010, as the Task Force came up with the story "Don Quixote the knight of impossible dreams," the carnival organizer Rosa Magalhães was overshadowed by just a few problems on the floats. In front of the drums came drums queen Bruna Bruno, who has been the front of the drums for years, along with Luciana Picorelli (current sponsor of the drums). They finished in 11th place, escaping relegation anew and still in the Special for Carnival 2011.

After the carnival, a school that has defined its plot in 2016, before the carnival 2015. That will be on the 2016 Summer Olympics in which after the departure of Alex de Souza backed the return Paulo Menezes and Jack Vasconcelos, as carnival. and had a change of queen of battery where after 11 years ahead of the battery Bruna Bruno abdicated the throne and was replaced by Bianca Leão. However, in a parade is shorter than the previous years, finished in 11th place.

However, for 2017 the school has changed the whole team starting with the carnival producer Severo Luzardo, director of carnival Wilsinho and the mestre-sala and porta-bandeira Phelipe Lemos and Dandara.

Classifications

References

External links
  
 GRES União da Ilha Samba-School Profile in English 

Samba schools of Rio de Janeiro
1953 establishments in Brazil